The members of the twelfth National Assembly of South Korea were elected on 12 February 1985. The Assembly sat from 11 April 1985 until 29 May 1988. Their four-year term was officially supposed to be over on 10 April 1989, but the Constitution of the Sixth Republic of South Korea shortened their terms.

Members

Seoul

Busan

Daegu

Incheon

Gyeonggi

Gangwon

North Chungcheong

South Chungcheong

North Jeolla

South Jeolla

North Gyeongsang

South Gyeongsang

Jeju

Proportional representation

Notes

References 

012
National Assembly members 012